BBC Studios Home Entertainment is a British video and music publisher founded in 1980 to release BBC's TV shows on videotapes, DVDs and Blu-rays.

History

BBC Video

BBC Video was established in 1980 as a division of BBC Enterprises (later BBC Worldwide) with John Ross Barnard at the head, just as home video systems were starting to gain ground.

At launch, the BBC had no agreement with British talent unions such as Equity or the Musician's Union (MU), so BBC Video was limited in the television programming it could release. Initially, video cassette and laser-disc releases were either programmes with no Equity or MU involvement, such as natural history and other documentaries, or material licensed from third parties, including feature films such as High Noon and the first video release of Deep Purple's California Jam concert.

For the first few years, the BBC produced videotapes in both VHS and Betamax formats. The company also worked with Philips on early Laserdisc releases, including a notable ornithology disc called British Garden Birds, presented by David Attenborough. This disc was published in 1982 and included digital data in the form of Teletext, which could be read by any suitably-equipped television. This pioneering use of a data channel on a consumer video format led directly to the development of the BBC Domesday Project in 1984–1986. Since videos could have stereo soundtracks, BBC Video produced stereophonic versions of many programmes that had been broadcast in mono. These included The Hitch Hiker's Guide to the Galaxy and the wedding of Charles, Prince of Wales, and Lady Diana Spencer.

The label grew significantly from £13 million turnover in 1989 to nearly £39 million in 1994, enjoying success from television and film serials which had proved popular when first televised and faced high demand for a video release once the new technology became widespread, reducing the need for television reruns.

In 1991, BBC Video was the number-one video label in the UK when it sold more prerecorded videotapes, by value as well as by unit count, than any other company, including all of the Hollywood studios combined.

For many years, BBC Video's releases were distributed by CBS/Fox Video in the United States until these rights expired on 30 June 2000, and weren't renewed. On 28 June 2000, BBC Worldwide Americas announced a new partnership with Warner Home Video that would begin effectively on 1 July 2000, excluding the release of Walking with Dinosaurs, which was instead transferred over from CBS/Fox to Warner on 1 September .

Video Collection International
Video Collection International was a video company based in London, England. It was opened in 1984. Originally part of the Prestwich Group, based in New Southgate, London, the company was subject to a management buyout. The company expanded rapidly, securing the market lead in retail video sales throughout the mid to late 1980s and into the early to mid-1990s. Video Collection International merged with Thames Video a year later in 1985, forming the Thames Video Collection label.

2 Entertain/BBC Studios Home Entertainment

On 12 July 2004, Woolworths Group PLC and BBC Worldwide announced a new joint-venture company called 2 Entertain (stylized as 2 | entertain), which their existing home video units would merge into which are BBC Video and Video Collection International. The BBC's home entertainment unit is still used as of today despite of the 2 Entertain merger. BBC Worldwide would hold 60% ownership, while Woolworths would hold 40%. The merger was completed by September of that year.

Around this time, Granada plc merged with Carlton Communications, and soon ended their deal with the ex-VCI company in order to distribute under Carlton's home media unit, which was renamed to Granada Ventures, and currently operates as ITV Ventures Limited. Channel 4 also began self-releasing titles on DVD themselves under the brand name Channel 4 DVD around the same time, later eventually go on to have their DVDs released by Spirit Entertainment, though still using Channel 4 DVD branding.

In December 2006, 2 Entertain renewed their US distribution agreement with Warner Home Video. An additional international deal was announced when the company signed a deal with En Pantalla to allow the company to distribute their factual titles in Latin America and Brazil.

On 26 November 2008, BBC Worldwide were announced to be in talks about purchasing Woolworths Group's 40% stake in 2 Entertain. This was finalised by March 2010, making 2 Entertain a fully owned subsidiary.

On 30 April 2012, BBC Worldwide signed a deal with Roadshow Entertainment for distribution of content in Australia and New Zealand within a five-year period, beginning 1 July. This deal was not renewed beyond this agreement, and currently BBC products in Australia and New Zealand are distributed by Universal Sony Pictures Home Entertainment.

As November 2013, the 2 Entertain brand is used as a label for non-BBC broadcast content.

In March 2022, BBC Studios Home Entertainment signed a distribution deal with British distributor Spirit Entertainment to represent its physical catalogue in the United Kingdom.

Operations

References

1980 establishments in the United Kingdom
BBC
ITV (TV network)
Channel 4
DVD companies of the United Kingdom
Entertainment companies established in 1980
Home video companies established in 1980
F. W. Woolworth Company
Home video distributors